Symphlebia affinis is a moth in the subfamily Arctiinae. It was described by Walter Rothschild in 1909. It is found in Peru.

References

Moths described in 1909
affinis